Beamon  may refer to:
 Autry Beamon (born 1953), an American former American football player
 Bob Beamon (born 1946), an American former track and field athlete
 Charlie Beamon (1934–2016), an American former pitcher in Major League Baseball
 Charlie Beamon Jr. (born 1953), an American former first baseman
 Trey Beamon (born 1974), an American baseball player
 Willie Beamon (born 1970), an American former American football cornerback

See also
 Beaman (surname)